The Baltic Single & Double Handed Polonez Cup Race (shortly Polonez Cup) is a Baltic Sea yachting regatta, known as the most difficult single-handed Baltic Sea offshore contest.

The regatta started in 1972 and was usually a yearly event matching solo sailors. However the event was not staged in 1982 and after 1983 went on hiatus. The regatta restarted in 2010.

The regatta is based at Swinoujscie on Usedom Island off northern-western Poland and is organized with help from the Polish Maritime Foundation, in the cities of Szczecin and Swinoujscie.

History
The initiators of single-handedly racing the Baltic Sea were captains Jerzy Siudy and Kazimierz Jaworski, who in 1973 arranged a "private" race along a Swinoujscie - Christianso - Swinoujscie course. They sailed on Taurus yachts. The results remain unknown.

In 1974 the Maritime University of Szczecin established a Yacht Club. The first Commander was Andrzej Jaśkiewicz. The regatta began at the organization's inception. The patron of the regatta was Eugeniusz Daszkowski, Rector of the Maritime University. To commemorate the founding, Krzysztof Baranowski circled the world on the Polonez, which became the name of the Single-Handed Cup. The Coordinator of the first edition of the race was Piotr Stelmarczyk then a Yacht Club employee. Subsequent editions were coordinated by Anthony Brancewicz, who took over as commodore of the club.

The Polonez Cup ran from 1973 until 1983 with a one-year break in 1982. Jaworski and Siudy planned to start the Polonez Regatta was initially held on May 25, the anniversary of Baranowski's entry to Plymouth. In later years the date changed to June and then to August. The Polonez Cup was founded by the Director of Maritime Yacht Shipyard "Leonia Teliga" - Edmund Bak.

In 1977 the race was held for the first time with international participants, whcn Czechoslovakian sailor Richard Konkolski from Yacht Club Bohumin, started.

The route remains unchanged: Swinoujscie - the passing portside group of islands Christiansø - Swinoujscie non-stop.

In 2013, third place went to Kuba Strzyczkowski, a journalist for Polskie Radio Program III.

Winners

References

External links

Polonez Cup (on the Yacht Club of Poland Swinoujscie website)

Recurring sporting events established in 1973
Sailing competitions in Poland
Single-handed sailing competitions
Yachting races
Sailing regattas